Two-time defending champion Evonne Goolagong defeated Renáta Tomanová in the final, 6–2, 6–2 to win the women's singles tennis title at the 1976 Australian Open. It was her fifth major singles title, as well as her sixth consecutive Australian Open final.

Seeds
The seeded players are listed below. Evonne Goolagong is the champion; others show the round in which they were eliminated.

 Evonne Goolagong (champion)
 Kerry Reid (first round)
 Helga Masthoff (quarterfinals)
 Sue Barker (second round)
 Renáta Tomanová (finalist)
 Helen Gourlay (semifinals)
 Lesley Bowrey (quarterfinals)
 Janet Young (second round)

Draw

Key
 Q = Qualifier
 WC = Wild card
 LL = Lucky loser
 r = Retired

Finals

Earlier rounds

Section 1

Section 2

External links
 1976 Australian Open – Women's draws and results at the International Tennis Federation

Women's singles
Australian Open (tennis) by year – Women's singles
1975 in Australian women's sport
1976 in Australian women's sport
1976 WTA Tour